The Bílovka is a river running through Czech Silesia in the north-east part of the Czech Republic. It is a left-bank tributary of the Oder. Its own tributaries include the Skřípovský potok and the Sezina River. Arising in the woodlands east of Březová, the river passes through a number of small villages and the city of Bílovec before it merges with the Oder south of the village of Jistebník.

Until recently, the Bílovka was one of the most drained rivers in its region, and in 2014 monitoring of regulation works started. The banks of the Bílovka have been strengthened, and the river itself has been straightened. Between 2003 and 2010 a bridge, carrying the D1 motorway, was built across the Bílovka, Jamník and Sezina rivers at their confluence.

References

Rivers of the Moravian-Silesian Region